A meditation centre is a place where meditation and related activities are practiced either individually or as group. These centres are located across the world and services are offered either free or with paid admission. The centres are operated by individuals and organisations.

Objective 

Meditation centres are intended to help people relieve stress. These centres are located across the world and are usually located away from cities to avoid any type of distractions.

Facilities 

The following facilities are often included in a meditation centre:

 Museum 

 Meditation halls

 Spa 

 Meditation lodges

 Club houses

 Hotel

 Restaurant

 Boutique

See also 

 Meditation

References 

Meditation
Religious places